Speranza varadaria, the southern angle moth, is a species of moth in the family Geometridae. It is found in North America.

The MONA or Hodges number for Speranza varadaria is 6314.

References

Further reading

 

Macariini
Articles created by Qbugbot
Moths described in 1860